Juan Pedro Arremón (8 February 1899 – 15 June 1979) was a Uruguayan football player. He competed in the 1928 Summer Olympics and played club football for Peñarol.

Arremón was a member of the Uruguay national team, which won the gold medal in the [[1928 Summer Olympics|1928 Olympic football tournament. He played 14 matches for the Uruguay national team, scoring one goal.

He coached Peñarol in 1943.

References

External links
profile

1899 births
1979 deaths
Uruguayan footballers
Uruguayan Primera División players
Peñarol players
Footballers at the 1928 Summer Olympics
Olympic footballers of Uruguay
Olympic gold medalists for Uruguay
Uruguay international footballers
Uruguayan football managers
Peñarol managers
Olympic medalists in football
Medalists at the 1928 Summer Olympics
Association football forwards